Cassinia diminuta, commonly known as dwarf cassinia, is a species of flowering plant in the family Asteraceae and is endemic to Victoria in Australia. It is a small, erect, aromatic shrub with spreading, needle-shaped leaves that are covered with cottony hair on the underside, and corymbs of up to two hundred heads of flowers arranged in corymbs.

Description
The lower surface of the leaves is densely covered with cottony white hairs.

Taxonomy and naming
Cassinia diminuta was first formally described in 2004 by Anthony Edward Orchard in Australian Systematic Botany from specimens collected in the same year.

Distribution and habitat
This species of Cassinia grows in mallee and woodland in central Victoria.

References

diminuta
Asterales of Australia
Flora of Victoria (Australia)
Plants described in 2004